Llangennech railway station serves the village of Llangennech near Llanelli, Carmarthenshire, Wales. Llangennech station is located at street level about half a mile away from the centre of the village. It is one of two stations (neighbouring Bynea being the other) located on the double track portion of the route that is shared with the Swansea District Line.

All trains serving the station are operated by Transport for Wales.

Facilities
The station is unstaffed and has no permanent buildings other than basic shelters on each platform. Passengers wishing to travel must buy tickets on the train or in advance. Amenities are limited to the standard CIS display, customer help point and payphone (the latter two at the main entrance). The platforms are linked by a barrow crossing, which is not recommended for use by disabled travellers without assistance.

In 2016, The Welsh Government funded the installation of reinforced glass fibre 'humps' on the platforms to improve access for wheelchair and pushchair users onto and off trains.

Services
All trains serving the station are operated by Transport for Wales. This is a request stop, whereby passengers have to give a hand signal to the approaching train driver to board or notify the guard when they board that they wish to alight from the train there.

Accidents and incidents
On 26 August 2020, a freight train carrying fuel derailed and caught fire near Llangennech.

References

External links 

Railway stations in Carmarthenshire
DfT Category F2 stations
Former Great Western Railway stations
Railway stations in Great Britain opened in 1841
Heart of Wales Line
Railway stations served by Transport for Wales Rail
Railway request stops in Great Britain
Llanelli Rural